Allan David Langlois (August 4, 1915 – January 30, 2005) was a Canadian curler He was the third on the Billy Walsh rink that won two Brier Championships for Manitoba, in 1952 and 1956.

References

1915 births
2005 deaths
Brier champions
Curlers from Winnipeg
Canadian male curlers